The 1971–72 Coupe de France was its 55th edition. It was won by Olympique de Marseille which defeated SC Bastia in the Final.

Round of 16

Quarter-finals

Semi-finals
First round

Second round

Final

References

French federation

1971–72 domestic association football cups
1971–72 in French football
1971-72